Blow All My Blues Away is a nine-disc compilation album by Janis Joplin. The album gathers rare, unreleased and alternate songs and performances by Joplin, from her very first live recordings in 1962 until 1970.

Track listing
Disc 1  – The Early Years 1962-63 
John Riley's Home, Austin, Texas 1962
"What Good Can Drinkin' Do"
Threadgill's Bar, Austin, Texas 1962
"C.C. Rider"
"San Francisco Bay Blues"
"Winin' Boy Blues"
"Careless Love"
"I'll Drown In My Own Tears"
San Jose Coffeeshop w/Jorma Kaukonen & Steve Mann 11/62
"Honky Tonk Angel"
"Empty Pillow"
Grant Ave - Coffeehouse, late 1962 or early 1963
"Gospel Ship"
"Stealin'"
"Leaving This Morning"
"Daddy, Daddy, Daddy"
"Careless Love"
"Bourgeois Blues"
"Black Mountain Blues"
Austin, Texas Reel #1: 1963
"Trouble In Mind"
"What Good Can Drinkin' Do"
"Silver Threads And Golden Needles"
"Mississippi River"
"Stealin'"
"No Reason For Livin'"
Austin, Texas Reel #2: 1964
"I'll Drown In My Own Tears"
"Daddy, Daddy, Daddy"
"Careless Love"
"San Francisco Bay Blues"
"Winin' Boy Blues"
"C.C. Rider"
"Leaving This Morning"

 Disc 2 – The Middle Years 1964-68 
"The Typewriter Tape" w/Jorma Kaukonen & Margaretta Kaukonen (typewriter) - San Jose, CA 25 June 1964 Jorma's Mother's House
"Typewriter Talk"
"Trouble In Mind"
"Leaving This Morning"
"Hesitation Blues"
"Nobody Knows You When You're Down And Out"
"Daddy, Daddy, Daddy"
"Long Black Train Blues"
San Francisco 1965 w/Dick Oxtrot Jazz Band
"Black Mountain Blues"
"Walk Right In"
"River Jordan"
"Mary Jane"
Janis & Big Brother & The Holding Company Sessions 1967-68
Mainstream LP Session Outtakes with Big Brother & The Holding Co.
"Call On Me" (1967)
"Bye Bye Baby" (1967)
Cheap Thrills Studio Session Outtakes w/Big Brother & The Holding Co.
"It's A Deal" (03/19/68)
"Easy Once You Know How" (03/19/68)
"Road Block" (03/25/68)
"Flower In The Sun" (03/25/68)
"Misery'n" (03/25/68)
"Catch Me Daddy" (03/25/68)
"Farewell Song" (03/25/68)
"Summertime" (03/28/68)

Disc 3 – The Late Years 1968-70 - The Late Years 1968-70
Cheap Thrills Studio Session Outtakes cont.
"Misery'n" (04/01/68)
"Catch Me Daddy" (04/01/68)
"Harry" (06/12/68)
The Grande Ballroom, Detroit, MI 01/02 MAR 1968
"Magic Of Love"
"Down On Me"
"Piece Of My Heart"
Amsterdam 01 APR 1969 w/The Kozmic Blues Band
"Maybe"
"Try (Just A Little Bit Harder)"
"Ball And Chain"
Kozmic Blues Outtakes & Demos - June & July 1969
"Dear Landlord" (outtake)
"Nobody Knows You When You're Down And Out" (Demo)
"Try (Just A Little Bit Harder)" (Demo)
"Let's Don't Quit" (Demo)
"Get It While You Can" #1 (Demo)
"Get It While You Can" #2 (inc.) (Demo)
3/28/70 Studio Session Outtakes with The Butterfield Blues Band
"One Night Stand" (1) Outtake
"One Night Stand" (2) Outtake
The Dick Cavett Show ABC-TV 25 JUN 1970
"Get It While You Can"

Disc 4 – Live Big Brother - Live Big Brother
California Hall, San Francisco, CA 12 FEB 1967 w/Big Brother & The Holding Co.
"Call On Me"
"Combination Of The Two"
"Blow My Mind"
"Down On Me"
"All Is Loneliness/Drum Solo"
"Road Block"
"Light Is Faster Than Sound"
"Bye Bye Baby"
"Goin' Down To Brownsville"
"Ball And Chain"
"I Know You Rider"

Disc 5 – Early Janis
Studio (unknown, from acetate) backed by jazz band, 1965
"Black Mountain Blues"
"Careless Love"
San Francisco, CA, unknown venue, Fall 1962
"Gospel Ship"
"Stealin'"
"Leaving This Morning"
"Daddy, Daddy, Daddy"
"Intro Careless Love"
"Careless Love"
"Bourgeois Blues"
"Black Mountain Blues"
Folk Theater, San Jose, CA DEC 1962 with Steve Talbot
"Honky Tonk Angel"
"Empty Pillow"
"Red Mountain Burgundy"
"No Reason For Livin'"
"Mary Jane"
KPFA Studios, San Francisco, CA 18 JAN 1963 with Larry Hanks, Roger Perkins & host Gert Cherito
"Black Mountain Blues"
"Columbus Stockade"
Jorma Kaukonen's House, San Jose, CA, probably 1964 with Steve Mann
"Winin' Boy Blues" 
"Trouble In Mind"

Disc 6 – Live Big Brother - Live Big Brother
Big Brother & The Holding Co. Carousel Ballroom, San Francisco, CA 23 JUN 1968(from low gen. 1/2 track reel)
(cuts in) "Combination Of The Two"
"I Need A Man To Love"
"Flower In The Sun"
"Light Is Faster Than Sound"
"Summertime"
"Mr Natural" (cuts)
Avalon Ballroom, San Francisco, CA 1968 (FM)
"Bye Bye Baby"
"Women is Losers"
"All Is Loneliness"
"Call On Me"
"Ball And Chain"

Disc 7 – Live 1963–1968
"So Sad To Be Alone" (1962)
"San Francisco Bay Blues" (1963)
"Apple Of My Eye"
"219"
"Codine"
"Nobody Knows You When You're Down And Out"
"Turtle Blues"
"I Ain't Got A Worry"
"Goin' Down To Brownsville" (1965)
"Catch Me Daddy"
"Piece Of My Heart" (1968)
"Down On Me" (1966)
"Summertime"
"I Need A Man To Love"
"Chat With Don Adams" (1968)
"Combination Of The Two"
"Farewell Song" (1968)

Disc 8 
"Piece Of My Heart"
"Summertime"
"Coo Coo"
"Combination of the Two"
"Ball And Chain"
"Down On Me"
"Piece of My Heart" (Reprise August 68)
"Interview"
"Piece Of My Heart" (1967)
"Summertime"
"Me"
"Raise Your Hand"
"Work Me Lord" (Swedish TV, April 1969)
"Stay With Me"
"Walk Right" (Winterland, San Francisco 04/21/68)
 
Disc 9 
Dick Cavett Introduction
"To Love Somebody"
"Interview" (July 1969)
"Little Girl Blue"
"Raise Your Hand" (With Tom Jones, December 1969)
"Kozmic Blues"
"Ego Blues" (With Johnny Winter)
"Help Me Baby" (With Johnny Winter)
"One Night Stand" (With Paul Butterfield Band, March 1970)
"Mercedes Benz"
"Try (Just A Little Bit Harder)"
"My Baby" (Final Concert, Harvard Stadium August 1970)
"My Baby" (March 1970)
"Sunday Morning Coming Down" (07/10/70)

2012 compilation albums
Janis Joplin compilation albums